Players and pairs who neither have high enough rankings nor receive wild cards may participate in a qualifying tournament held one week before the annual Wimbledon Tennis Championships.

Seeds

  Jason Stoltenberg (qualified)
  Nduka Odizor (qualifying competition, lucky loser)
  Roger Smith (first round)
  Martin Laurendeau (qualifying competition, lucky loser)
  Scott Davis (second round)
  Andrei Olhovskiy (qualified)
  Heiner Moraing (qualified)
  Johan Anderson (qualifying competition)
  Dan Cassidy (qualifying competition)
  Barry Moir (qualified)
  Glenn Michibata (qualified)
  Patrick Baur (first round)
  Diego Nargiso (qualified)
  Rick Leach (second round)
  Marc Flur (first round)
  Gianluca Pozzi (second round)
  Brad Drewett (qualifying competition)
  Marcel Freeman (qualifying competition)
  Michael Robertson (second round)
  Luke Jensen (first round)
  Bill Scanlon (qualified)
  Éric Winogradsky (qualifying competition)
  Omar Camporese (qualifying competition)
  Huub van Boeckel (qualified)
  Danilo Marcelino (second round)
  Danie Visser (second round)
  Michael Kures (second round)
  Michael Kupferschmid (second round)
  Carl Limberger (qualified)
  Richard Fromberg (second round)
  Andrei Cherkasov (first round)
  Tobias Svantesson (qualified)

Qualifiers

  Jason Stoltenberg
  Tobias Svantesson
  Goran Ivanišević
  Carl Limberger
  Todd Woodbridge
  Andrei Olhovskiy
  Heiner Moraing
  Gustav Fichardt
  Huub van Boeckel
  Barry Moir
  Glenn Michibata
  Bill Scanlon
  Diego Nargiso
  Shane Barr
  Ricardo Acuña
  Glenn Layendecker

Lucky losers

  Nduka Odizor
  Martin Laurendeau

Qualifying draw

First qualifier

Second qualifier

Third qualifier

Fourth qualifier

Fifth qualifier

Sixth qualifier

Seventh qualifier

Eighth qualifier

Ninth qualifier

Tenth qualifier

Eleventh qualifier

Twelfth qualifier

Thirteenth qualifier

Fourteenth qualifier

Fifteenth qualifier

Sixteenth qualifier

External links

 1988 Wimbledon Championships – Men's draws and results at the International Tennis Federation

Men's Singles Qualifying
Wimbledon Championship by year – Men's singles qualifying